Oxygen: Inhale (stylized in all capitals as OXYGEN:INHALE) is the seventh studio album by Canadian rock band Thousand Foot Krutch. It was released on August 26, 2014 in the United States.

Background

On March 27, 2014 the band announced that they will be recording the new album on April 21. In an interview at Rock on the Range, McNevan stated that the album would be released on August 26, 2014 under the title Oxygen: Inhale. The band launched a Pledge Music campaign to raise funds for the album in May. The first single from the album, "Born This Way", was released on July 22. The second single, titled "Untraveled Road" was released on August 6 on YouTube. On August 19, the entire album was released on iTunes First Play, a part of iTunes Radio.

Track listing

Personnel
Trevor McNevan - producer, vocals, guitar, acoustic guitar
Joel Bruyere - bass guitar
Steve Augustine - drums, percussion
Aaron Sprinkle - producer, keyboards, additional guitar
Additional pianos, keys, strings, effects: Trevor McNevan and Aaron Sprinkle
Slide guitar on "Born This Way" and electric leads on "Light Up": Shawn Tubbs
Dobro on "Glow": Chad Jeffers

References 

2014 albums
Thousand Foot Krutch albums
Self-released albums
Albums produced by Aaron Sprinkle